Gábor Kőhalmi (31 October 1955) is a former Hungarian professional footballer who played as defender. He was a member of the Hungarian national football team.

Career 
In October 1972, he made his debut for Haladás. In the summer of 1973, he was transferred from Haladás to Budapest Honvéd FC. In 1977, he was loaned to Csepel SC for a year. At the end of the season, he returned to Honvéd, and from mid-November 1978 he was a Csepel player for good. He played for Csepel until 1984. Between 1980 and 1984 he played 123 league games for Csepel and scored three goals. In 1984 he was banned for several years for bribery.

National team 
He played 2 times for the Hungarian national team in 1983.

Honours 

 Nemzeti Bajnokság I (NB I)
 Second: 1974-75

References 

1955 births
Living people
Hungary international footballers
Nemzeti Bajnokság I players
Szombathelyi Haladás footballers
Budapest Honvéd FC players
Csepel SC footballers
Association football defenders
People from Szombathely
Association football players not categorized by nationality